El secuestro de un policia ("Kidnapping of a policeman") is a 1991 Mexican film. It stars Jorge Abraham and Adalberto Arvizu, directed by José Luis Avendaño. It is also known as Ráfagas de metralleta (Machine gun blast).

Cast
 Jorge Abraham
 Adalberto Arvizu
 José Luis Avendaño
 Agustín Bernal
 Manuel Capetillo hijo
 Fernando Casanova
 María de Montecarlo
 Rojo Grau
 Miguel Gómez Checa
 Guillermo Inclán
 Estela Inda
 Queta Lavat
 Sasha Montenegro
 Elsa Montes
 Elsa Nava
 Jorge Gonzalez Oliva
 Arlette Pacheco
 Antonio Raxel
 Gabriela Rodriguez
 Gilberto Román
 Jorge Santos
 Rebeca Silva
 Armando Silvestre
 Martha Stringel
 Jorge Vargas
 Leo Villanueva

References

External links
 

1991 films
1990s action comedy-drama films
Films directed by Alfredo B. Crevenna
1990s Spanish-language films
1991 comedy films
1991 drama films
Films about kidnapping
Mexican action comedy-drama films
1990s Mexican films